George Warren Smith (born November 20, 1949) is a former competition swimmer who represented Canada at the 1968 Summer Olympics in Mexico City.  Smith placed fifth in the event final of the 200-metre individual medley, fourth in the 4x200-metre freestyle relay, and seventh in the 4x100-metre freestyle relay.  He also competed in the preliminary heats of the 200-metre freestyle and 400-metre individual medley, but did not advance.

At the 1970 British Commonwealth Games in Edinburgh, Smith won two gold medals in the 200-metre and 400-metre individual medley events.  He also won two silver medals in the 4x100-metre and 4x200-metre freestyle relay events, sharing second-place honours with Canadian teammates Ralph Hutton, Robert Kasting and Ron Jacks in both relays. His brother Graham and sister Becky also competed in swimming.

Inducted to the Alberta Sports Hall of Fame and Museum in 1976.

See also
 List of Commonwealth Games medallists in swimming (men)

References

1949 births
Living people
Canadian male freestyle swimmers
Canadian male medley swimmers
Olympic swimmers of Canada
Swimmers from Edmonton
Swimmers at the 1968 Summer Olympics
UBC Thunderbirds swimmers
Swimmers at the 1970 British Commonwealth Games
Commonwealth Games medallists in swimming
Commonwealth Games gold medallists for Canada
Commonwealth Games silver medallists for Canada
Medallists at the 1970 British Commonwealth Games